Mr. Halpern and Mr. Johnson is a 1983 American made-for-television drama film produced for HBO starring Laurence Olivier and Jackie Gleason and was directed by Alvin Rakoff.

Plot
The film is a two-person drama featuring Olivier as Mr. Joseph Halpern, an elderly working class British Jewish widower and Gleason as Mr. Ernest Johnson, a dapper American retired accountant. At the funeral of his wife, Florence, Mr. Halpern meets Mr. Johnson, who surprises him with the disclosure that he and Florence had maintained a close friendship for the last 40 years. Six weeks later, Mr. Halpern and Mr. Johnson meet for a drink at a hotel. A long conversation ensues that reveals aspects of himself and one has been in love with the other's wife for 30 years. At the end, Mr. Halpern and Mr. Johnson agree to meet again.

There are two locations in the movie: a New York hotel and a New Jersey cemetery. The hotel scene was filmed at the HTV West Studio on Bath Road in Bristol, England and the cemetery scenes were filmed outside Bristol.

Cast
Laurence Olivier as Joseph "Joe" Halpern
Jackie Gleason as Ernest Johnson

References
 Corry, John. "TV View; Miscast or Not, Olivier Rises Above the Role" The New York Times, retrieved October 30, 2018.
Picks and Pans Review: Mr. Halpern & Mr. Johnson at People magazine, retrieved October 30, 2018.
Mr. Halpern and Mr. Johnson (TV) at The Paley Center for Media

External links

1983 television films
1983 films
1983 drama films
1980s English-language films
Films directed by Alvin Rakoff
Films produced by Ely Landau
HBO network specials
American drama television films
1980s American films
English-language drama films